Eudonia atmogramma is a moth in the family Crambidae. It was described by Edward Meyrick in 1915. It is endemic to New Zealand.

The wingspan is 23–24 mm. The forewings are ochreous-grey, usually suffused with whitish on the veins. The interneural spaces are suffusedly sprinkled with dark fuscous. The hindwings are light grey, but paler towards the base. Adults have been recorded on wing in September.

References

Moths described in 1915
Eudonia
Moths of New Zealand
Endemic fauna of New Zealand
Taxa named by Edward Meyrick
Endemic moths of New Zealand